Milton Pinto (born  in Osasco, São Paulo, is a Brazilian composer, poet, photographer and acoustic guitarist. His music is classic-pop-celtic influenced. In 2010 he released  his debut studio album entitled Full of Flowers through a collaboration of four female Irish singers soloists from the popular Gardiner Street Gospel Choir from Dublin, Ireland.

Discography
 2010 – Full of Flowers

See also
 Celtic Woman

References

External links
Official site
Soundunwound
Revebnation official channel

Brazilian guitarists
Brazilian male guitarists
Brazilian composers
Brazilian male poets
Brazilian photographers
Living people
Year of birth missing (living people)